Decatur Municipal Airport  is a city-owned public airport two miles (3.7 km) north of Decatur, in Wise County, Texas.

Most U.S. airports use the same three-letter location identifier for the FAA and IATA, but Decatur Municipal Airport is assigned LUD by the FAA and has no IATA designation (IATA assigned LUD to Lüderitz Airport in Namibia).

Facilities and aircraft 
Its one runway, 17/35, is 4,200 by 60 feet (1,280 x 18 m) asphalt.

In the year ending September 4, 2008 the airport had 13,200 general aviation operations, average 36 per day. 48 aircraft were then based at this airport: 79% single-engine, 13% multi-engine and 8% glider.

References

External links 
  at Texas DOT Airport Directory
 Aerial image as of February 1995 from USGS The National Map
 

Airports in Texas
Buildings and structures in Wise County, Texas
Transportation in Wise County, Texas